The Semnon is a  long river in the Mayenne, Maine-et-Loire, Ille-et-Vilaine and Loire-Atlantique départements, northwestern France. Its source is at Congrier. It flows generally west-northwest. It is a left tributary of the Vilaine into which it flows between Pléchâtel and Bourg-des-Comptes.

Départements and communes along its course
This list is ordered from source to mouth: 
Mayenne: Congrier, Saint-Erblon, Senonnes
Maine-et-Loire: Pouancé
Ille-et-Vilaine: Eancé, Martigné-Ferchaud
Loire-Atlantique: Fercé
Ille-et-Vilaine: Thourie
Loire-Atlantique: Soulvache
Ille-et-Vilaine: Teillay, Ercé-en-Lamée, Lalleu, Tresbœuf, La Bosse-de-Bretagne, Bain-de-Bretagne, Pancé, Pléchâtel, Poligné, Bourg-des-Comptes

References

Rivers of France
Rivers of Loire-Atlantique
Rivers of Ille-et-Vilaine
Rivers of Mayenne
Rivers of Maine-et-Loire
Rivers of Pays de la Loire
Rivers of Brittany